Idarucizumab, sold under the brand name Praxbind, is a monoclonal antibody used as a reversal agent for dabigatran.

Idarucizumab was developed by Boehringer Ingelheim. One study sponsored by the manufacturer found that idarucizumab effectively reversed anticoagulation caused by dabigatran within minutes.

It was approved for medical use in the United States and in the European Union in 2015.

Society and culture

Names 
Idarucizumab is the International nonproprietary name (INN). The description was updated in 2016. Idarucizumab is the United States Adopted Name (USAN).

See also 
 Andexanet alfa
 Ciraparantag
 Vitamin K
 Bentracimab

References

External links 
 

Antidotes
Monoclonal antibodies
Boehringer Ingelheim
Breakthrough therapy